Marstal Savings Bank (Danish: Marstal Sparekasse) was a savings bank in Marstal on the island of Ærø in southern Denmark. It existed from 1822 to 1974. Its former headquarters is located at  Kirkestræde 5 in Marstal.

History
Marstal Savings Bank founded on 28 February 1822 by a group of local residents in Marstal. Its original name was Spare- og Laanekassen i Marstal. It was merged into Amtssparekassen for Fyn on 18 September 1974.

References 

Danish companies established in 1822
1974 disestablishments in Denmark
Defunct banks of Denmark
Ærø